Dendrelaphis grandoculis commonly called as the large-eyed bronzeback is a species of Colubrid snake endemic to the Western Ghats of southwestern India.

Description
Eye extremely large, as long as its distance from the rostral. Rostral much broader than long, visible from above, its upper border nearly straight ; suture between the internasals as long as that between the pra^frontals or a little longer ; frontal as long as its distance from the end of the snout, as long as the parietals ; loreal elongate; one pre- and two postoculars ; temporals 2+2; upper labials 9, fourth, fifth, and sixth entering the eye ; 5 lower labials in contact with the anterior chin-shields, which are shorter than the posterior. Scales in 15 rows, vertebrals nearly as large as the outer row. Ventrals 174–170; anal divided; subcaudals 117. Olive-brown above, with irregular small black blotches ; eye bordered with whitish ; lower parts pale olive. Total length 4 feet ; tail 13  1/2 inches. (after Boulenger)

Etymology
Greek, grand meaning large and oculis of the eye; hence the common name large-eyed bronzeback.

Distribution
This species is endemic to Western Ghats and is known from Agasthyamalai, Travancore hills, Periyar Tiger Reserve, Anaimalai, Waynad, Coorg and Malnad region of Karnataka, northwards till Castle Rock near Goa.

Habits and habitat
Rather slow in speed for a bronzeback, it slithers across tree branches foraging for lizards, frogs and small birds to eat. A diurnal and arboreal forest-dwelling snake, partial to rainforests. Rarely seen in plantations and monocultures.

References

 Boulenger, George A. 1890 The Fauna of British India, Including Ceylon and Burma. Reptilia and Batrachia. Taylor & Francis, London, xviii, 541 pp.
 Meise,Wilhelm & Hennig,Willi 1932 Die Schlangengattung Dendrophis. Zool. Anz. 99 (11/12): 273-297
 Chandramouli, S. R., and S. R. Ganesh. (2010). Herpetofauna of southern Western Ghats, India–reinvestigated after decades. TAPROBANICA: The Journal of Asian Biodiversity.
 Ganesh, S. R., Bhupathy, S., David, P., Sathishkumar, N., & Srinivas, G. (2014). SNAKE FAUNA OF HIGH WAVY MOUNTAINS, WESTERN GHATS, INDIA: SPECIES RICHNESS, STATUS, AND DISTRIBUTION PATTERN. Russian Journal of Herpetology, 21(1).
 Ganesh, S. R., Chadramouli, S. R., Sreekar, R., & Shankar, P. G. (2013). Reptiles of the central Western Ghats, India—a reappraisal and revised checklist, with emphasis on the Agumbe Plateau. Russian Journal of Herpetology, 20(3), 181–189.
 Hutton, A. F., & David, P. (2009). Notes on a collection of snakes from south India, with emphasis on the snake fauna of the Megamalai Hills (High Wavy Mountains). J. Bombay Nat. Hist. Soc, 105(3), 299.

Colubrids
Snakes of Asia
Reptiles of India
Reptiles described in 1890
Taxa named by George Albert Boulenger
grandoculis